Greg Lansky (born December 12, 1982) is a French artist, entrepreneur and investor based in the United States. He has directed and produced a number of adult films he describes as art. Lansky was a founder of Vixen Media Group in 2014, one of the largest companies in the adult entertainment business, and was its chief executive officer until January 2020 when he sold his full stake in the business. In 2022, Lansky released the sculpture "Algorithmic Beauty".

Biography
Lansky was born on December 12, 1982 in Paris, France. He was raised Jewish. Lansky attended marketing school in Paris and worked for various TV networks. After dropping out of school, he briefly worked in television production in Paris and interned with a production company that produced reality TV shows. Shortly after he moved to Los Angeles to pursue a career.

Business ventures
In 2005, Lansky moved from Paris to Los Angeles and started working in adult entertainment industry. In 2006, Lansky was given a directorial contract. Lansky went on to direct many titles for New Sensations/Digital Sin until 2007. Lansky opened his production company and began directing and producing for the web-based adult network Reality Kings. Lansky stopped working for Reality Kings in 2014 to concentrate on creating his own company.

In 2014, Lansky founded Vixen Media Group and established its suite of award-winning studios: Vixen, Blacked, and Tushy. In 2018, Lansky transitioned into running his company and producing rather than directing.

Rolling Stone profiled Lansky and his "adult entertainment empire," and Ad Age called him "a master of SFW marketing." Kanye West revealed on Jimmy Kimmel Live! that his favorite porn website was Lansky's Blacked. Lansky offered West the opportunity to direct an adult film, and the pair were photographed together backstage at the 2018 Pornhub Awards. Several hip hop artists have showed association with Lansky and his brands including Post Malone, Lil Pump and Trippie Redd.

He sold his stake in Vixen Media Group in January 2020 to pursue other business ventures.

In 2022, Lansky began releasing artwork online. In an ode to the Venus de Milo, "Algorithmic Beauty" is a six-foot eight-inch marble sculpture of a nude woman "covered in plastic-surgery scars, cellulite ripples across her posterior" holding up a mobile phone. His works have been considered divisive with some critics recognizing the insight into modern culture and the dark side of technology, while others dismiss it as superficial, crass and failing to make any substantial contribution to the discourse.

Recognition

Lansky has been compared to Hugh Hefner and is credited with having "elevated the [adult] business as a whole." He was called "the most-pirated man in porn," and the movies his company produced are "some of the most-watched adult film content in the world." Lansky has been referred to as "The Spielberg of Porn" and his Instagram was called "the most NSFW" profile of all time by GQ France.

Awards
During the 2018 AVN Awards, Lansky became the second man in history to ever win AVN Director of the Year three consecutive times.

 Best Web Director – XRCO Award – 2014
 Best Web Director – XRCO Award – 2015
 Best Director – XRCO Award – 2016
 Best Release –  XRCO Award – 2016
 Best Cinematography – AVN Awards – 2016
 Director of the Year – AVN Awards – 2016
 Best Director – NightMoves Award – 2016 (Editor's Choice)
 Director of the Year – AVN Awards – 2017
 Best Director – Non-Feature AVN Awards – 2017
 Best Marketing Campaign AVN Awards – 2017
 Director of the Year – Body of Work 2017 XBIZ Award
 Best new Studio: Vixen – DVDEROTIK Awards – 2017
 Director of the Year – AVN Awards – 2018

References

External links 
 
 
 
 Greg Lanksy Business AVN

French people of Jewish descent
French pornographic film directors
French pornographic film producers
Living people
1982 births